PSLV-C28 (a.k.a. DMC3 mission) was the 29th consecutive successful mission (overall 30th) of the PSLV program. The PSLV-C28 carried and successfully deployed 5 satellites in the Sun-synchronous orbit. The PSLV-C28 carried three identical optical earth observation satellites (DMC3-1, DMC3-2 & DMC3-3), an optical earth observation technology demonstrator microsatellite (CBNT-1), and an experimental nanosatellite (De-orbitSail). All the satellites were built by Surrey Satellite Technology (SSTL). Although built by SSTL, the "De-orbitSail" belonged to the Surrey Space Centre.

See also
 Indian Space Research Organisation
 Polar Satellite Launch Vehicle

References 

Spacecraft launched in 2015
Polar Satellite Launch Vehicle